Garrett Reynolds (born August 2, 1990) is an American BMX Dirt and Freestyle rider from Gold Coast.

Reynolds debuted at the X Games 2007 BMX Park 4th the first rookie to score a BMX Park medal since Brazilian Diogo Canina in 2006.

In 2007, Reynolds took gold at X Games Brazil, X Games Mexico and X Games Dubai, finishing fourth in the X Games 13 street contest.

Career highlights 
 X Games 2007 BMX Park 4th
 X Games 2008 BMX Street 1st
 X Games 2009 BMX Park 11th
 X Games 2009 BMX Street 1st
 X Games 2009 BMX Park 11th
 X Games 2010 BMX Street 1st
 X Games 2010 BMX Park 13th
 X Games 2011 BMX Park 6th
 X Games 2011 BMX Street 1st
 X Games Los Angeles 2012 BMX Street 1st
 X Games Barcelona 2013 BMX Street 1st
 X Games Los Angeles 2013 BMX Street 2nd
 X Games Austin 2014 BMX Street	1st
 World of X Real BMX 2016 BMX Real BMX 1st
 X Games Minneapolis 2017 BMX Street 1st
 X Games Minneapolis 2017 BMX Street 1st
 X Games Minneapolis 2018 BMX Street 2nd
 X Games Sydney 2018 BMX Street	3rd
 X Games Shanghai 2019	BMX Street	1st
 X Games Minneapolis 2019 BMX Street	1st
 World of X Real BMX 2020 BMX Real BMX 1st

References 

1990 births
BMX riders
American male cyclists
Living people
X Games athletes
People from Toms River, New Jersey